Tunnet Taimla (June 21, 1988 – February 9, 2023) was an Estonian Renju player.

Career

Taimla started to play Renju in 1995 at the age of 7. After four years of studying, he won the Youth European Championship (1999) among boys 14 years and under. Later, he won the Youth European Championship twice, in 2001 (among boys 14 years and under) and in 2005 (among boys 18 years and under). In 2002 he achieved the title of Youth World Champion (among boys 14 years and under).

Since childhood he has taken part in adult tournaments as well, eventually managing to achieve significant results. In 2002 he took part in the Team World Championship as a member of Estonian team which scored 2nd place. Several months later he took part in a European Renju Championship (2002) and achieved silver medal.

In 2003 he qualified to the final stage of Renju World Championship AT and won it, thus becoming individual World Champion. He participated in several World Championships later achieving 2nd place in 2009. Since 2002, he became a constant member of Estonian team on Team World Championships. In 2013, he won the Renju World Championship AT for the second time. 

As a member of Estonian team he has won bronze (2010), four silver medal places (2002, 2004, 2006, 2010) and three gold medal places 2008, 2014, 2016 in Team World Championships.

In 2019, Tunnet Taimla became the first foreigner to win The 4th Chinese National Mind Sports Olympiade Games of China as a Hubei Province team coach.

In 2022, Taimla was elected vice-president of the Renju International Federation. 

Taimla died on February 9, 2023 at the age of 34.

References

1988 births
2023 deaths
Estonian Renju players
Renju world champions
Sportspeople from Viljandi